The 2008 Air New Zealand Cup was a provincial rugby union competition involving 14 teams from New Zealand. Matches started on Thursday 31 July 2008, and continued until the final on 25 October 2008.

This season was the third of the expanded competition, which succeeded the First Division of the National Provincial Championship. It started with a 10-week round robin in which every team missed out on playing 3 teams in the competition. This was followed by a knockout playoff involving 8 teams, made up of quarterfinals, semifinals and the final.

On 11 August 2008 the New Zealand Rugby Union initially announced that Tasman and Northland would both be relegated from the Air New Zealand Cup after the completion of the 2008 season. Both teams failed to meet criteria which included financial stability, population, player training and development, playing history, and administration. This decision was reversed towards the end of the 2008 season, with Tasman and Northland remaining in the competition for two more years.

Canterbury won their sixth national provincial title by defeating Wellington 7–6 at Westpac Stadium, Wellington. It was the third consecutive season that Wellington have finished runners-up.

Standings

The top eight teams in pool play advanced to the Quarter Finals.

Table notes
 Pos = Table Position
 Pld = Played
 W   = Win (Worth 4 points)
 D   = Draw (Worth 2 points)
 L   = Loss (Worth 0 points)
 PF   = For (Total points scored)
 PA   = Against (Total points scored against)
 PD = Points difference
 BP1 = Bonus Point (1 Bonus Point will be awarded to any team that scores 4 tries or more regardless of win/loss/draw.)
 BP2 = Bonus Point (1 Bonus Point will be awarded to the losing side if the loss is by 7 points or less.)
 Pts = Progressive points tally

'''NB:
 It is possible to receive 2 bonus points in a loss.
 In the event of a tie on points the ranking of teams is decided by:
 The winner of the last match between the two provinces if played this season then,
 Highest points differential then,
 Most tries scored then,
 A coin toss.

Points Scorers

Try Scorers

Attendances

Fixtures and results

Round 1

Round 2

Round 3

Round 4

Round 5

Round 6

Round 7

Round 8

Round 9

Round 10

Knockout stage

Quarterfinals

Semifinals

Final

See also
 Air New Zealand Cup
 Canterbury in the 2008 Air New Zealand Cup
 Heartland Championship
 2008 Heartland Championship
 Manawatu Turbos season 2008

External links
 Air New Zealand Cup official website

References